Churapchinsky District (Çurapçı uluuha) is an administrative and municipal district (raion, or ulus), one of the thirty-four in the Sakha Republic, Russia. It is located in the center of the republic and borders Tattinsky District in the north, Ust-Maysky District in the east and southeast, Amginsky District in the south, Megino-Kangalassky District in the west, and Ust-Aldansky District in the northwest. Its administrative center is the rural locality (a selo) of Churapcha. As of the 2010 Census, the total population of the district was 20,387, with the population of Churapcha accounting for 43.0% of that number.

Geography
The landscape of the district is mostly flat. The main rivers in the district are the Amga and the Tatta. There are many lakes in the district, the largest of which is Lake Churapcha.

History 
The district was established on March 25, 1930.

Administrative and municipal status
Within the framework of administrative divisions, Churapchinsky District is one of the thirty-four in the republic. The district is divided into seventeen rural okrugs (naslegs) which comprise thirty rural localities. As a municipal division, the district is incorporated as Churapchinsky Municipal District. Its seventeen rural okrugs are incorporated into seventeen rural settlements within the municipal district. The selo of Churapcha serves as the administrative center of both the administrative and municipal district.

Inhabited localities

Demographics
As of the 1989 Census, the ethnic composition was as follows:
Yakuts: 97.0%
Russians: 1.5%
Evenks: 0.4%
Evens: 0.3%
others: 0.8%

Economy 
Businesses in the district specialize mainly in agriculture and the raising of cattle and horses.

References

Notes

Sources
Official website of the Sakha Republic. Registry of the Administrative-Territorial Divisions of the Sakha Republic. Amginsky District. 

Districts of the Sakha Republic
States and territories established in 1930